Barbolino is a rural locality (a village) in Gorodetskoye Rural Settlement, Kichmengsko-Gorodetsky District, Vologda Oblast, Russia. The population was 15 as of 2002.

Geography 
Barbolino is located 11 km southwest of Kichmengsky Gorodok (the district's administrative centre) by road. Zabereznik is the nearest rural locality.

References 

Rural localities in Kichmengsko-Gorodetsky District